Greek-Montenegrin relations are foreign relations between Greece and Montenegro. Relations between the Principality of Montenegro and the Kingdom of Greece officially started in 1881. The countries' relations were excellent especially during the Balkan Wars and World War I. Greece recognized Montenegro on 13 June 2006. Both countries established diplomatic relations on 18 December 2006. Montenegro has an embassy in Athens. Greece has an embassy in Podgorica. Both countries are full members of the Council of Europe, and of the NATO. Also Greece is an EU member and Montenegro is an EU candidate. Greece supports the integration of Montenegro into the European Union.

See also 
 Foreign relations of Greece
 Foreign relations of Montenegro 
 Accession of Montenegro to the European Union 
 Greece–Serbia relations
 Greece–Yugoslavia relations

External links 
  Greek Ministry of Foreign Affairs about relations with Montenegro

 
Montenegro
Greece